Salu in Iran may refer to:
 Salu, Fars (صلو - Şalū)